Oreonebria angustata is a species of ground beetle in the Nebriinae subfamily that can be found in Italy and Switzerland.

Subspecies
The species bears 1 subspecies which can be found in Italy and Switzerland:
Nebria angustata angustata Dejean, 1831

References

angustata
Beetles described in 1830
Beetles of Europe